Freddy, the Guitar and the Sea is a 1959 West German musical film directed by Wolfgang Schleif and starring Freddy Quinn, Corny Collins and Sabine Sesselmann.

Cast
 Freddy Quinn as Freddy Ullmann
 Corny Collins as Sussi
 Sabine Sesselmann as Katja
 Peter Carsten as Jan
 Christian Machalet as Stefan
 Walter Scherau as Vater Ossenkamp
 Vickie Henderson
 Camilla Spira as Mutter Ossenkamp
 Harry Meyen as Lothar Brückner
 Arthur Schröder as Herr Brückner - ein Uhrensammler
 Carl Voscherau as Kapitän
 Ralf Wolter as Fietje
 Wolfgang Gruner as Angesteller in der Bar
 Jürgen Graf as Thomsen
 Axel Monjé as Barbesitzer
 Werner Stock
 Ferry Olsen
 Käte Alving
 Siegfried Dornbusch
 Heinz Lausch
 Heinz Lingen
 Bruno W. Pantel
 Cora Roberts
 Anneliese Würtz

References

Bibliography 
 Reimer, Robert C. & Reimer, Carol J. The A to Z of German Cinema. Scarecrow Press, 2010.

External links 
 

1959 films
West German films
German musical films
1959 musical films
1950s German-language films
Films directed by Wolfgang Schleif
UFA GmbH films
Films set in Hamburg
1950s German films